Matthew Hanks LeCroy (born December 13, 1975) is an American former professional baseball catcher, first baseman, and designated hitter and current manager for the Rochester Red Wings. During his time in Major League Baseball (MLB), LeCroy had the distinction of being the active player with the most plate appearances without a stolen base in his career.

Career
LeCroy is a 1994 graduate of Belton-Honea Path High School in Honea Path, South Carolina and attended Clemson University to pursue a degree in elementary education. While at Clemson, he was named to the 1996 U.S. Olympic Baseball Team and helped the team to a bronze medal after losing to both Cuba (gold medal) and Japan (silver medal) before defeating Nicaragua in the bronze medal game. In 1997, he was drafted as a catcher in the first round (50th overall) of the Major League Baseball Draft by the Minnesota Twins. Although challenged defensively behind the plate, averaging double-digit passed balls while throwing out less than 30 percent of potential base stealers, LeCroy put up superior power numbers in the minor leagues, hitting 101 home runs over five years in the Twins' system. In 1999, LeCroy again competed at the international level when he played for the United States at the 1999 Pan American Games in Winnipeg, Manitoba. The United States took second place behind Cuba in games made notable by the first time professional baseball players were allowed to compete in international games.

LeCroy got his first taste of the majors in 2000 when he made the major league club out of spring training. From 2000 to 2002, LeCroy would split time between the Twins and their AAA teams, playing for the Salt Lake Buzz and later for the Edmonton Trappers after the Twins changed their minor league affiliate in 2001. Due to his struggles behind the plate, LeCroy also spent time at first base and designated hitter; totaling more games in the major leagues at the latter position than he did at first base and catcher combined. His peak years in the majors were 2003 (.287, 17 HR, 64 RBI in 107 games) and 2005 (.260, 17 HR, 50 RBI in 101 games). Despite his productive 2005 season, Minnesota chose not to resign LeCroy and he signed a minor league contract with the Washington Nationals.

Though battling bone spurs in his throwing knee, LeCroy was asked to fill in during a May 25, 2006, game against the Houston Astros at a time when Washington's starting catcher, Brian Schneider and backup Wiki Gonzalez, were out with injuries. He was replaced by utilityman Robert Fick in the middle of the seventh inning after the Astros stole seven bases and LeCroy committed two catching errors. After the game, manager Frank Robinson shed tears during the press conference regarding his removal of Matt in the middle of the seventh inning, which is usually considered embarrassing. LeCroy was designated for assignment July 18, which he accepted, and spent the rest of the year playing for the New Orleans Zephyrs, then Washington's AAA affiliate team.

LeCroy was signed to a minor league deal by the Twins in  after turning down an offer from the Washington Nationals to manage one of their minor-league teams. LeCroy started the 2007 season as designated hitter playing for the Rochester Red Wings in the International League. He had his contract purchased by the major league club on September 9, 2007, when their fourth catcher José Morales went down with an injury, and finished the season with the Twins.

LeCroy was outrighted to the minor leagues by the Twins on October 11, 2007, but he refused the assignment and became a free agent. On February 15, LeCroy signed a minor league contract with an invitation to spring training with the Oakland Athletics. On March 16, 2008, LeCroy was reassigned to minor league camp and asked the Athletics to grant his release, which they did. LeCroy then signed with the Lancaster Barnstormers of the independent Atlantic League of Professional Baseball in April 2008. LeCroy would play 94 games with Lancaster (hitting .326 with 22 HR and 83 RBI) before retiring at the end of the season.

As a member of the Twins, LeCroy became one of the few major leaguers to pinch hit a walk-off grand slam in a win over the Toronto Blue Jays. He was always a threat to hit a home run, and hit 60 in his career of limited at bats in 472 games over his eight-year major league career.

Coaching career
In November 2008, LeCroy was hired by the Nationals to manage the team's Class A affiliate, the Hagerstown Suns. In 2011, LeCroy was moved up to the High Single-A Carolina League when he was named as the manager of the Potomac Nationals. In 2012, he was named the Double A Harrisburg Senators manager. In November 2013, he was named the bullpen coach on new Nationals manager Matt Williams' coaching staff, replacing Jim Lett. He was fired with Williams and the entire coaching staff after the 2015 season, but was brought back for his second stint as manager of the Harrisburg Senators for the 2016 season.

The Nationals announced December 15, 2020, that LeCroy was being promoted to manager of the Class-AAA Rochester Red Wings.

Personal life
LeCroy and his wife Holly have five children, daughter Isabella (b. 2004), daughter Maggie (b. 2006), son Noah (b. 2008), and fraternal twins Max and Mabree (b. 2012).

References

External links

1975 births
Living people
American expatriate baseball players in Canada
Baseball coaches from South Carolina
Baseball players at the 1996 Summer Olympics
Baseball players at the 1999 Pan American Games
Baseball players from South Carolina
Clemson Tigers baseball players
Edmonton Trappers players
Fort Myers Miracle players
Fort Wayne Wizards players
Lancaster Barnstormers players
Major League Baseball bullpen coaches
Major League Baseball catchers
Major League Baseball first basemen
Medalists at the 1996 Summer Olympics
Minnesota Twins players
Minor league baseball managers
New Britain Rock Cats players
New Orleans Zephyrs players
Olympic bronze medalists for the United States in baseball
Pan American Games medalists in baseball
Pan American Games silver medalists for the United States
People from Belton, South Carolina
Rochester Red Wings managers
Rochester Red Wings players
Salt Lake Buzz players
Washington Nationals coaches
Washington Nationals players
Medalists at the 1999 Pan American Games